St. Francis Institute of Management and Research is a Management Institute located in Borivali West, Mumbai. The college is popularly known as SFIMAR. The college is rated as 'A+' grade college by National Assessment and Accreditation Council (NAAC) in the second NAAC cycle.

History
The Society of Franciscan Brothers was founded in 1901 in Mandapeshwar, in Eksar village, then, in the Northwest corner of Mumbai city. The Society was established to look after and educate the orphans in Mumbai and the surrounding areas. A formal Orphanage and a School was established in 1908. The Congregation has now 68 centres in India, running Orphanages, Schools, Technical Education Centres, Informal Technical Education Centres for School dropouts, Leprosy Centres, Agricultural Training Farms, Youth Centres, Clinics, Dispensaries, Hospitals etc. The main focus in all these activities are oriented around the orphans, the poor, and the lower middle class without any other distinctions whatsoever. They have spread into South America, Sri Lanka, Germany, Switzerland & Italy for similar type of work with Mumbai as the Headquarters.
SFIMAR has been awarded ISO- 9001 -2015 by Det Norske Veritas Management which assures consistency of the prescribed high quality of students through needed robust academic and allied systems in place.

This is one of the best college of Mumbai University..

Programmes offered
SFIMAR offers Master of Management Studies (MMS) & Post Graduate Diploma in Management (PGDM), a management course guided by Mumbai University.
SFIMAR offers specializations in:
 Finance
 Marketing
 Human Resources
 IT
 Operations

Campus

References
  Official SFIMAR website

Franciscan universities and colleges
Catholic universities and colleges in India
Business schools in Mumbai
Affiliates of the University of Mumbai